The Circuito Ayrton Senna, also known as CAB circuit, was a  street circuit opened in 2009, located in Salvador, Bahia. The curves that made up the circuit's  were the Curva dos Orixás, Curva do Acarajé, Curva da Balança, Curva do Dendê and Curva da Vitória.

Cacá Bueno and Allam Khodair were the most successful drivers on the circuit, both won 2 races. The circuit was closed after the race in 2014.

References 

Defunct sports venues in Brazil
Sports venues in Bahia
2009 establishments in Brazil
2014 disestablishments in Brazil
Ayrton Senna